Hassoumi Massaoudou is a Nigerien politician who served in the government of Niger as Minister of Finance from October 2016 to January 2019. A leading member of the Nigerien Party for Democracy and Socialism (PNDS-Tarayya), he was Minister of Communication, Culture, Youth and Sports from 1993 to 1994, President of the PNDS Parliamentary Group from 1999 to 2004, Director of the Cabinet of the President from 2011 to 2013, Minister of the Interior from 2013 to 2016, and Minister of National Defense in 2016 and minister of Foreign Affairs since 2021.

Political career
Massaoudou was a founding member of the PNDS, a party created under the leadership of Mahamadou Issoufou in 1990; when the party held its Constitutive General Assembly on 23–24 December 1990, Massaoudou was designated as its Secretary for Information and Propaganda. Following Niger's first multiparty elections in 1993, a coalition government headed by Mahamadou Issoufou was named on 23 April 1993; it included Massaoudou as Minister of Communication, Culture, Youth and Sports. He served in that position until Prime Minister Issoufou resigned in late September 1994 and the PNDS left the ruling coalition, with a new government being named on 5 October 1994.

Following the military coup led by Ibrahim Baré Maïnassara on 27 January 1996, Massaoudou was arrested on 13 July 1996 and tortured while in detention, with mock executions being used.

Massaoudou was elected to the National Assembly in the November 1999 parliamentary election and served as President of the PNDS Parliamentary Group during the parliamentary term that followed. As of 2004, he was the First Deputy Secretary-General of the PNDS.

Regarding President Mamadou Tandja's 2009 efforts to create a new constitution that would remove presidential term limits, Massaoudou said that Tandja had lost his legitimacy and that the opposition would "treat him as a mere putschist". He told the press on 1 June 2009, that Tandja was attempting the "demolition of democratic institutions". He also said that "simultaneous giant rallies across the country" would be held on 7 June to oppose Tandja's planned constitutional referendum.

Massaoudou headed Issoufou's campaign for the January–March 2011 presidential election. Issoufou won the election and took office as President on 7 April 2011; he  appointed Massaoudou as Director of the Cabinet of the President, with the rank of Minister, on the same day.

Massaoudou served as Director of the Cabinet for over two years before being appointed to the government as Minister of the Interior, Public Security, Decentralization, and Customary and Religious Affairs on 13 August 2013. After Issoufou was sworn in for a second term, Massaoudou was moved to the post of Minister of National Defense on 11 April 2016. Six months later, on 19 October 2016, he was again moved, this time to the post of Minister of Finance.

References

Year of birth missing (living people)
Living people
Ministers of council of Niger
Members of the National Assembly (Niger)
Members of the Pan-African Parliament from Niger
Nigerien Party for Democracy and Socialism politicians
Communication ministers of Niger
Culture ministers of Niger
Defense ministers of Niger
Foreign ministers of Niger
Finance ministers of Niger
Interior ministers of Niger
Sports ministers of Niger